Besh Evili (also Romanized as Besh Evīlī; also known as Besh Evlī) is a village in Qaravolan Rural District, Loveh District, Galikash County, Golestan Province, Iran. At the 2006 census, its population was 429, in 129 families.

References 

Populated places in Galikash County